The 1946 Cork Intermediate Hurling Championship was the 37th staging of the Cork Intermediate Hurling Championship since its establishment by the Cork County Board in 1909.

Charleville won the championship following an 8-06 to 4-06 defeat of Cloughduv in the final. This was their second championship title overall and their first title since 1914.

References

Cork Intermediate Hurling Championship
Cork Intermediate Hurling Championship